Ellsworth K. Gaulke (October 6, 1925 – August 1, 1993) was an American businessman, educator, and politician.

Born in Wausau, Wisconsin, Gaulke served in the United States Army Air Forces during World War II. He received his bachelor's and master's degrees from what is now Central Michigan University and did graduate work at University of Minnesota Duluth. He was a school principal and restaurant owner in Lac du Flambeau, Wisconsin. He served as town board chairman and on the school board. Gaulke served in the Wisconsin State Assembly as a Democrat in 1971.

Notes

1925 births
1993 deaths
People from Lac du Flambeau, Wisconsin
Politicians from Wausau, Wisconsin
Military personnel from Wisconsin
United States Army Air Forces soldiers
Central Michigan University alumni
University of Minnesota Duluth alumni
Businesspeople from Wisconsin
Educators from Wisconsin
Mayors of places in Wisconsin
School board members in Wisconsin
20th-century American businesspeople
20th-century American politicians
Democratic Party members of the Wisconsin State Assembly